Ronald Senungetuk (1933 – January 21, 2020) (last name pronounced Sinuŋituk in Iñupiaq) was an Iñupiaq artist originally from Wales, Alaska, who worked primarily in wood and metal.

Career
Senungetuk was a sculptor and silversmith and was known for his abstractions of animal figures. He attended the Bureau of Indian Affairs school in Sitka before training at the School for American Craftsmen at the Rochester Institute of Technology and received his B.A. in 1960. Senungetuk received a Fulbright Fellowship to study at Statens Håndværks og Kunstindustriskole Oslo, Norway. He and his wife, Turid, an accomplished silversmith, lived in Homer.

Senungetuk taught at the University of Alaska Fairbanks beginning in 1961. He founded their metalsmithing program and served as director of its Native Art Center. During his teaching career he emphasized modern style of jewelry-making, avant-garde conepts, and respect for native traditional imagery. However, Senungetuk preferred not to be identified solely as a native artist, saying "A lot of people will call you an Eskimo artist. I'd rather be an artist who happened to be Inupiat." 

His work was exhibited at the Anchorage Museum, the Museum of the North at the University of Alaska Fairbanks, the Native Medical Center in Anchorage, and the Pratt Museum in Homer.

His daughter is musician and ethnomusicology scholar Heidi Aklaseaq Senungetuk.

Students 

 Abraham Anghik Ruben

Awards and recognition
1979 State of Alaska Governor's Award for the Arts
2008 Denali National Park Artist-in-Residence
2008 Rasmuson Foundation Distinguished Artist Award

See also
 Alaska Native art
 Inuit art

Notes

External links
 Alaskakool interview

1933 births
2020 deaths
American silversmiths
Artists from Alaska
Inupiat people
Native American sculptors
People from Homer, Alaska
Rochester Institute of Technology alumni
University of Alaska Fairbanks faculty
Animal artists
Sculptors from Alaska